Ezekiel 28 is the twenty-eighth chapter of the Book of Ezekiel in the Hebrew Bible or the Old Testament of the Christian Bible. This book contains the prophecies attributed to the prophet/priest Ezekiel, and is one of the Books of the Prophets. This chapter contains a prophecy against the king of Tyre and a prophecy against neighbouring Sidon, concluding with a promise that Israel will be "delivered from the nations".

Text
The original text was written in the Hebrew language. This chapter is divided into 26 verses.

Textual witnesses
Some early manuscripts containing the text of this chapter in Hebrew are of the Masoretic Text tradition, which includes the Codex Cairensis (895), the Petersburg Codex of the Prophets (916), Aleppo Codex (10th century), Codex Leningradensis (1008).

There is also a translation into Koine Greek known as the Septuagint, made in the last few centuries BC. Extant ancient manuscripts of the Septuagint version include Codex Vaticanus (B; B; 4th century), Codex Alexandrinus (A; A; 5th century) and Codex Marchalianus (Q; Q; 6th century).

Against the Ruler of Tyre (28:1-19)
This part contains an oracle against the ruler (negid; "prince") of Tyre (verses 1–10) and a lament over the destruction of the king (melek) of Tyre (verses 11–19).

Verse 2
 ""Son of man, say to the prince of Tyre,
 ‘Thus says the Lord God:
 "Because your heart is lifted up,
 And you say, 'I am a god'
 I sit in the seat of gods,
 In the midst of the seas',
 Yet you are a man, and not a god,
 Though you set your heart as the heart of a god"
 "Son of man" (Hebrew: בן־אדם -): this phrase is used 93 times to address Ezekiel.
 "Prince" (Hebrew: נָגִיד ): the Hebrew word has a meaning of "ruler", "leader" of people, tribal "chief", a nobleman. The leader of Tyre is judged for his pride and self-deification. During Ezekiel's time, this leader would have been the Tyrian king Ittobaal III.

Verse 3
Are you wiser than Daniel?
Is no secret hidden from you?
The name "Daniel" may refer to Danel, "a man of renown in ancient literature". The text in the Jerusalem Bible reads:
You are now wiser than Daniel;
there is no sage as wise as you.

Verse 13
You were in Eden, the garden of God;
every precious stone was your covering,
sardius, topaz, and diamond,
beryl, onyx, and jasper,
sapphire, emerald, and carbuncle;
and crafted in gold were your settings
and your engravings.
On the day that you were created
they were prepared.
"Every precious stone was your covering": comparable to the stones in the "breastpiece of judgement" wore by the High Priest of Israel (cf.).
"Sapphire" (Hebrew: ספיר ): "a kind of gem"; "lapis lazuli" (Ezekiel 1:26).

Against Sidon (28:20-23)
This section contains an oracle of Yahweh's judgement against Sidon, another member of the anti-Babylonian alliance (Jeremiah 27), but less important than Tyre, with the ultimate goal, repeated twice in this brief oracle, that they shall acknowledge Yahweh's sovereignty.

Promises to Israel (28:24-26)
Following the oracles against Israel neighbours, two promises are prophesied to Israel: (1) Israel will cease to be provoked by these neighbours (verse 24); (2) having punished Israel's neighbours, Yahweh will restore Israel to its land and his presence to Israel (verses 25–26).

See also

Danel
 Daniel (biblical figure)
 Eden
 Israel
 Jacob
 Sidon
 Ezekiel's cherub in Eden
 Tyre
Related Bible passages: Genesis 3, Isaiah 14, Isaiah 23, Daniel 4, Acts 12, 2 Thessalonians 2

Notes

References

Sources

External links

Jewish
Ezekiel 28 Hebrew with Parallel English
Ezekiel 28 Hebrew with Rashi's Commentary

Christian
Ezekiel 28 English Translation with Parallel Latin Vulgate

28
Phoenicians in the Hebrew Bible